The Myanmar Music Association (MMA) is Myanmar's music industry association. The organisation was established in 1952 and consists of 5 divisions: historical traditional music, modern traditional music, contemporary music, production and technical work.

MMA established a Burmese pop library in 2010, to create a standardised list of songs published in the country, and of help musicians and songwriters obtain their proper share of royalty payments from the use of their songs. In 2013, it reopened a traditional Burmese music school, which had been closed since 2007.

In July 2015, it announced that it would launch the Myanmar Music Academy Awards in 2016 to recognise outstanding Burmese musicians.

References

Music organisations based in Myanmar
Organizations established in 1952
Music industry associations
1952 establishments in Burma